Betongtavlen ("The Concrete Tablet") is a Norwegian architecture and civil engineering award issued by the National Associations of Norwegian Architects and the Norwegian Concrete Association. The award is issues to a structure "where concrete is used in an environmentally, esthetically and technically excellent way". The award was first issued in 1961 for Bakkehaugen Church and has as of 2011 been awarded 53 times. The award is not necessarily awarded every year, and up to four structures have been awarded in a year. Structures awarded prices include office buildings, campus buildings, ski jumps, houses, hotels, bridges, tunnels, dams, oil platforms, industrial facilities, viewpoints and cultural institutions. Prizes are not necessarily awarded immediately after the structure was completed—for instance, Elgeseter Bridge was completed in 1951 but awarded the prize in 2006.

List of awards
The following is a list of the awards, including the year it was awarded, the structure, the credited architects and engineering firms or people, the type of structure and the municipality in which it is located.

See also

 List of engineering awards

References

Civil engineering awards
Architecture awards
1961 establishments in Norway
Norwegian awards